The men's decathlon at the 2007 World Championships in Athletics was held at the Nagai Stadium, Osaka, on Friday, 31 August, and Saturday, 1 September.

Medalists

Schedule

Friday, 31 August

Saturday, 1 September

Records

Final ranking
Key

Points table after 10th event

See also
Athletics at the 2007 Pan American Games – Men's decathlon
Athletics at the 2007 Summer Universiade – Men's decathlon

References
Summary Decathlon - Men. IAAF. Retrieved on 2009-07-17.

External links
Osaka 2007 website

Decathlon